Binay is a surname. Notable people with the surname include the members of the influential Binay Family of Makati:

Abigail Binay (born 1975), Filipino politician and current mayor of Makati
Elenita Binay (born 1943), Filipino politician and wife of Jejomar Binay; former mayor of Makati
Jejomar Binay (born 1942), Filipino politician and former Vice President of the Philippines
Jejomar Binay Jr. (born 1977), Filipino politician and former mayor of Makati
Nancy Binay (born 1973), Filipino politician and senator of the Philippines

See also
 Binay, a barangay in Palapag, Philippines
 Mete Binay (born 1985), Turkish weightlifter